Hattarvík is a small village on the east side of the island of Fugloy, Faroe Islands, and is the easternmost settlement  in the Faroes archipelago.

The village is encircled by high mountains on three sides.

History
Hattarvik was founded in 900. The stone church was built in 1899. Some old stone houses are currently being restored. These houses are said to relate to the Flokksmenn. These were three strong men who wanted to seize power in the Faroe Islands in the 15th century.

Transportation
Hattarvik is reachable by a ferry once or twice a day from Hvannasund and also by a helicopter three times a week from Klaksvík and Tórshavn. A road leads to the other village on Fugloy, Kirkja in the south.

Population
The population estimates range from 5 to 44. There were 11 people in the village as of 2020.

See also
 List of towns in the Faroe Islands

References

External links
Faroeislands.dk: Hattarvík Images and description of all cities on the Faroe Islands.

Fugloy
Populated places in the Faroe Islands
900 establishments
10th-century establishments in Denmark